Salzwedel-Land was a Verwaltungsgemeinschaft ("collective municipality") in the Altmarkkreis Salzwedel (district), in Saxony-Anhalt, Germany. It was situated around Salzwedel, which was the seat of the Verwaltungsgemeinschaft, but not part of it. It was disbanded on 1 January 2011. 

The Verwaltungsgemeinschaft Salzwedel-Land consisted of the following municipalities:

Former Verwaltungsgemeinschaften in Saxony-Anhalt